Newmarket Transit was a transit system in York Region, Ontario, Canada. While Newmarket was considerably smaller than any of the three cities in the southern part of the York region, it had a quality transit service. Service on some of the routes was provided until midnight, with 15-minute service provided on trunk routes (55A, 55B) during rush hours. Newmarket Transit was merged with York Region's other services to form York Region Transit in 2001.

Newmarket Transit began sometime in the early 1970s as a contracted service from the town replacing the Newmarket Town Bus (c. 1958 and renamed from the Newmarket Bus Lines c. 1948).

Routes

Originally Newmarket Transit used to operate only 4 routes, denoted as A, B, C, D. Those routes were later renumbered 11, 22, 33 and 44. Route 55, a trunk route from Newmarket Bus Terminal to the 404 Plaza, was eventually added and  included 2 branches - 55A via Davis Drive and 55B via Gorham and Eagle streets which were interlined during late evening and weekend service.

As the city expanded, routes 66 and 77 were added to service the new developments west of Yonge Street (route 66) and south-east of Mulock Drive (route 77). Routes 22 and 33 were cancelled in mid-1990s with the remaining routes adjusted  slightly to partially compensate for the lost services.

In 1998 Newmarket Transit restructured its routes to provide direct service to major destinations.
 Route 55C was added to provide direct service on Mulock Drive between Yonge Street and Leslie Street.
 Routes 11 and 77 were combined into a single route 77/11 which provided one-way circular service on major streets in eastern part of Newmarket. This route was later extended south on Bayview avenue to connect with Aurora Transit.
 Routes 44 and 66 were restructured to provide service in south-west and north-west parts of the town. While the routes were interlined and the schedule listed them as '44/66' and '66/44', those in fact remained two separate routes.

In the fall of 1999 Newmarket Transit assumed the responsibilities over the public transit in the neighboring town of Aurora, restructuring the old circular route into two community bus routes: A1 and A2.

Following the merger of the four transit systems, York Region Transit introduced its own route numbers in 2002.
 Route 44 retained its number. Currently YRT is considering changing it to route 59 which will also include the northern portion of the former route 77/11.
 Route 55A became route 55.
 Route 55B became route 56.
 Route 55C became route 57. (Later changed to 57A.)
 Route 66 retained its number for a couple of years, then it was absorbed by the route 57A.
 Route 77/11 became route 33. Couple years later the route was split and the services were incorporated into route 54 (Bayview Avenue), route 57 (Stonehaven Avenue) and route 55 (branch 55B, servicing the area north of Davis drive). Currently YRT is considering converting the 55B branch into a separate route 59 which will also incorporate route 44.
 Routes A1 and A2 became routes 31 and 32. Both routes were restructured with the arrival of the Viva service.

Roster

 International/Wayne 375 Lifeguard
 Orion Bus Industries Orion VI : 9701, 9702, 9703, 9704, 9801, 9802
 Orion Bus Industries Orion II (25') : 9707, 9708
 Ontario Bus Industries Orion I (1.502): 8201, 8501, 8601, 8602, 8801, 9001, 9002

  Denotes wheelchair access

See also

 Markham Transit
 Vaughan Transit
 Richmond Hill Transit

External links
 York Region Transit
 York In Motion
 VivaYork
 Can-car Coach Services – Tokmakjian Inc Group

Transit agencies in Ontario
Transport in Newmarket, Ontario
York Region Transit